The Camp Iron Mountain was a sub camp of the US Army Desert Training Center in Riverside County, California. The main headquarters for the Desert Training Center was Camp Young; this is where General Patton's 3rd Armored Division was stationed. Camp Iron Mountain was designated a California Historic Landmark (No.985.6). 
Camp Iron Mountain is near the site of Camp Granite, both are  miles East of Indio, California off Interstate 10 and California State Route 62 near the Granite Mountains in San Bernardino County, California. In 1980 Camp Iron Mountain received the listing as an Area of Critical Environmental Concern from the Bureau of Land Management. The listing was given as Camp Iron Mountain is the best preserved of the Desert Training Center Camps. The Bureau of Land Management put up fences to protect the camp from Off-road vehicle traffic. Still at the camp today are a 200 x 175 foot contour training map, some rock mosaics, two church altars, rock lined roads and walkways. The camp is named after the near by Iron Mountains.

Camp Iron Mountain was built in April 1942, to prepare troops to do battle in North Africa to fight the Nazis during World War II.  At Camp Iron Mountain were stationed the 2nd Armored Division under General George S. Patton and the 80th Division. The trained troops went on to fight in the North African campaign. When completed the camp had 15 shower buildings, 26 latrines, 113 wooden tent frames, an amphitheater, a 4,000-gallon water tank tower and two 3,000 gallon water tank towers. Camp had 6 training ranges for rifle, handguns and machine guns. The camp closed on 16 March 1944. The army used live-fire exercises and warning signs are still on the site.  The most preserved items at the camp are two stone outdoor chapel altars. One was built for Catholic church services and one for Protestant church service.

Camp Iron Mountain Army Field 
Camp Iron Mountain Airfield landing strip was built near the Camp Iron Mountain to support the training activities. The runway was 4,500 feet long made of steel landing mats. Small planes were used to watch the desert survival training, gunnery practices, and tank tactics training. Also aircraft were used to coordinate tanks and other armored vehicles from the air. After the war the air strip became the Iron Mountain Pumping Plant Airport (72CL), that is still in use today.

California Historical Landmark Marker
Marker on the Riverside, California site reads:
NO. 985 DESERT TRAINING CENTER, CALIFORNIA-ARIZONA MANEUVER AREA (ESTABLISHED BY MAJOR GENERAL GEORGE S. PATTON, JR.) - CAMP IRON MOUNTAIN - Iron Mountain Divisional Camp was established at this site in the Spring of 1942. One of eleven such camps built in the California-Arizona Desert to harden and train United States troops for service on the battlefields of World War II. The first major unit trained here was the 3rd Armored Division followed by elements of the 4th, 5th, 6th, and 7th Armored Divisions. In all, one million men trained in the desert before the Training Center was officially closed in May 1944. The most unique feature built at this camp is the huge relief map built into the desert floor. It can still be seen (1985).'''

See also
California Historical Landmarks in San Bernardino County, California
California Historical Landmarks in Riverside County, California
Camp Coxcomb
Camp Granite
 Camp Clipper and Camp Essex
 Camp Coxcomb
 Camp Ibis
California during World War II

References

External links 
 
Training Center Boogie - Sony by John Malcolm Penn, song about : Desert training camps

Military in San Bernardino County, California
Military installations in California
Closed training facilities of the United States Army
History of San Bernardino County, California
United States in World War II
1942 establishments in California